James Mark Crandall (December 7, 1912 – February 1983) was an American professional baseball player, manager and coach. In his only Major League service, he served as a coach on the last St. Louis Browns team in history, the 1953 edition.

Born in Wadena, Indiana, he was the son of Doc Crandall, a star pitcher with the New York Giants from 1908–1913, and one of the game's top early relief pitchers.

Jim Crandall's professional baseball career was confined to minor league baseball, except for the latter half of the  Major League season, when he swapped jobs with Bill Norman, who was on the coaching staff of Brownie manager Marty Marion.  Crandall had begun the year as skipper of the San Antonio Missions of the Double-A Texas League, where he lasted into July before taking Norman's old post with the Browns.

Losers of 100 games, St. Louis' last American League entry finished eighth and last,  games behind the New York Yankees. Owner Bill Veeck was pressured into selling the team to Baltimore interests, who shifted the club to their city for 1954.  Marion and Crandall were not retained by the new ownership and management team, and Crandall resumed his minor league career.  A switch-hitting catcher and right-handed pitcher, he played in 1932, 1934–1940 and 1945–1947. He managed in 1940 and from 1946–1955, spending much of that time working in the farm systems of the Browns and Cincinnati Redlegs.

He died in February 1983 at age 70 in Bullhead City, Arizona, although no specific date of death has been listed.

References

1912 births
1983 deaths
Baseball players from Indiana
Des Moines Demons players
Hollywood Stars players
Indianapolis Indians players
Johnstown Johnnies players
Kansas City Blues (baseball) players
People from Benton County, Indiana
People from Bullhead City, Arizona
Pittsburg Browns players
St. Louis Browns coaches
St. Louis Browns scouts
San Antonio Missions managers
Toledo Mud Hens players
Vancouver Capilanos players